Pinerolo is a town and comune in the Metropolitan City of Turin, Piedmont, northwestern Italy,  southwest of Turin on the river Chisone. The Lemina torrent has its source at the boundary between Pinerolo and San Pietro Val di Lemina.

History
Archaeological remains found in the center of Pinerolo in the early 1970s testify the human presence in the area in prehistoric times Remains of the Roman necropolis of Dama Rossa, found during works for the Pinerolo-Turin highway in 2003, show that the area at the time was the seat of agricultural activities

The toponym of Pinerolo appears only in the Middle Ages, in an imperial diplom dating from 981, by which Otto II confirmed its possession, within the March of Turin, to the Bishops of Turin. The town of Pinerolo was one of the main crossroads in Italy, and was therefore one of the principal fortresses of the dukes of Savoy. Its military importance was the origin of the well-known military school that still exists today. The fortress of Fenestrelle is nearby. Later, Pinerolo was ruled by the abbot nullius of Pinerolo, who ran the abbey of Abbadia Alpina, even after the city had established itself as a municipality (1247) under the government of Thomas II of Savoy.

From 1235, Amadeus IV of Savoy exercised over the town a kind of protectorate, which became absolute in 1243, and was continued thereafter by either the House of Savoy, or its cadet-branch, the House of Savoy-Acaia.

When French troops invaded Piedmont (1536), Pinerolo was conquered; it remained under French control until 1574. It fell again to France in 1631 with the treaty of Cherasco.

France agreed to hand Pinerolo back to the house of Savoy under the Treaty of Turin (1696), with the conditions that its stronghold's fortifications be demolished and that Savoy withdraw from the League of Augsburg against Louis XIV.

Economy
The economy of the Waldensian Valleys (right slope of Val Chisone, Valle Germanasca and Val Pellice) and of the plain between these valleys and the Po (river) course revolves around Pinerolo.

Several industries have their base in this area, particularly mechanical, paper making, chemical and textile industries, and also absorb manpower from the nearby population centers.

The leading companies are Freudenberg Sealing Technologies (former Corcos), which produces seals for rotating shafts and valves sterns, Raspini, a meat processing company, TN Italy (former NN Inc.), which manufactures ball bearings, the Trombini Group (ex Annovati), which supplies the furniture industry with chipboard, and PMT Italia, which supplies the pulp and paper industry with paper machines. Moreover, Pinerolo is the trade center of the surrounding mountain area.
 
The agriculture and the breeding of the livestock are conducted with advanced techniques.

Pinerolo is famous for being the house city of the first society of mutual help, foundend in 1848. Today, it is still active and also hosts a museum, the Museo Storico del Mutuo Soccorso with historic archives and a library. Health assistance is guaranteed by the Civil Hospital of Pinerolo Ospedale E. Agnelli and by a network of public and private health assistance centres. The Public assistance is inserted in the bigger frame of the Local Sanitary Company (or Azienda Sanitaria Locale ASL TO3).

Main sights
Pinerolo Cathedral: 9th century Roman Catholic church with a Romanesque bell tower and a Gothic façade (restored after the 1808 earthquake)
San Maurizio: Gothic style church
Galup factory, which is famous for the local sweets and cake 
Historical center 
Train station 
Town hall
Historic Museum of Mutual Help
Museum of Chivalry

People
People born in Pinerolo include:
 Lidia Poët (1855-1949), the first Italian female lawyer and an important figure in female emancipation
 Luigi Facta (1861-1930), politician, journalist and last Prime Minister of Italy before the dictatorship of Benito Mussolini
 Ferruccio Parri (1890-1981), partisan and politician who served as Prime Minister of Italy for several months in 1945
Patrizia Polliotto (1962-), Italian corporate lawyer, entrepreneur
Fabio Miretti (2003-), professional football player who currently plays as a midfielder for  club Juventus

People who died here include:
 Anna Canalis di Cumiana (1680-1769) (morganatic spouse of King Victor Amadeus) died in the convent here.
 Nicolas Fouquet, marquis de Belle-Île, vicomte de Melun et Vaux, (1615–1680) superintendent of Finances in France under Louis XIV, was imprisoned in Pignerol from 1665 until his death in 1680.
 David Llewellyn Snellgrove (29 June 1920 - 25 March 2016), a British Tibetologist noted for his pioneering work on Buddhism in Tibet as well as his many travelogues.
The "Man in the Iron Mask" was imprisoned in Pinerolo starting from 1669.
 The Venerable Bruno Lanteri, priest and founder of the Oblates of the Virgin Mary, died here in 1830.

Sports
The venue Pinerolo Palaghiaccio hosted curling events at the 2006 Winter Olympics. The 2011 Tour de France featured a stage in the area.

The Uruguayan football team Peñarol takes its name from the Montevideo neighbourhood of Peñarol, which in turn takes its name from this town.

Twin cities
 Gap, France, since 1963
 Traunstein, Germany, since 1986
 San Francisco, Argentina, since 1996
 Derventa, Bosnia and Herzegovina, since 2005

See also
 Diocese of Pinerolo

References

Venues of the 2006 Winter Olympics